Henry Franklin Hendrix House, also known as the Frank Hendrix House, was a historic home located at Batesburg-Leesville, Lexington County, South Carolina. It was originally built in 1888, and remodeled in 1907 in the Classical Revival style. It was demolished September 2016 by Frank Cason Development to build a Taco Bell despite public outcry.
It was a two-story, weatherboard residence with a pressed shingle metal roof and a brick foundation. The front facade featured a central projecting portico supported by four colossal Ionic order columns.

It was listed on the National Register of Historic Places in 1982.

References 

Houses on the National Register of Historic Places in South Carolina
Neoclassical architecture in South Carolina
Houses completed in 1888
Houses in Lexington County, South Carolina
National Register of Historic Places in Lexington County, South Carolina